Ornithospila is a genus of moths in the family Geometridae described by Warren in 1894.

Species
Ornithospila viridimargo Prout southern Moluccas
Ornithospila avicularia (Guenée, 1857) Sikkim, Bhutan
Ornithospila bipunctata Prout, 1916 Peninsular Malaysia, Sumatra, Borneo, Natuna Islands, Philippines, Sulawesi
Ornithospila carteronae Herbulot Moluccas
Ornithospila submonstrans (Walker, 1861) Peninsular Malaysia, Sumatra, Borneo, Philippines
Ornithospila sundaensis Holloway, 1976 Peninsular Malaysia, Sumatra, Borneo
Ornithospila cincta (Walker, 1861) Peninsular Malaysia, Sumatra, Borneo
Ornithospila succincta Prout, 1917 Peninsular Malaysia, Sumatra, Borneo, Philippines, New Guinea
Ornithospila lineata (Moore, 1872) Sri Lanka, north-eastern Himalayas, Vietnam, Burma, Borneo, Sumatra
Ornithospila esmeralda (Hampson, 1895) north-eastern Himalayas, Sundaland, Philippines

References

Geometridae